Vida Isabella Steinert (née Vickers; 24 January 1903 – 27 February 1999) was a New Zealand painter, born in Hamilton, New Zealand. Also known as Vida Isabella Vickers, Vida Isabella Steinert, or Vida Steinhart.

Education 
A graduate of the Elam School of Fine Arts, Auckland, Steinert was part of the Rutland group of painters, alongside Jack Crippen and Ruth Coyle. During her career she was based in Auckland, and associated with painters Charles Tole, Bessie Christie, Helen Brown, Joan Lillicrap, Joycelyn Harrison-Smith, and Alison Pickmer.

Career 
A modernist painter, her work often depicted life in New Zealand, specifically local people and landscapes. Steinert worked primarily in oils, watercolors, and pencils. Her works include: The Valley; Ponies at the fair; Road to Colville; and Spanish Dancer.

Exhibitions 
In 1950, Steinert exhibited with The Group, an informal art association from Christchurch, New Zealand, that formed to provide a freer alternative to the Canterbury Society of Arts. Steinert also exhibited with the Rutland Group and the Auckland Society of Arts.

References

Further reading  
Artist files for Steinert are held at:
 E. H. McCormick Research Library, Auckland Art Gallery Toi o Tāmaki
 Te Aka Matua Research Library, Museum of New Zealand Te Papa Tongarewa
Also see:
 Concise Dictionary of New Zealand Artists, McGahey, Kate (2000) Gilt Edge

External links

1903 births
1999 deaths
New Zealand painters
Elam Art School alumni
People from Hamilton, New Zealand
People associated with the Rutland Group
University of Auckland alumni
New Zealand women painters
People associated with the Auckland Society of Arts
20th-century New Zealand women artists
People associated with The Group (New Zealand art)